This is a list of Institutes of Mathematics or Mathematical Institutes.

Americas
 American Institute of Mathematics
 Clay Mathematics Institute, Cambridge, Massachusetts
 Centre de Recherches Mathématiques, at the Université de Montréal
 Center for Mathematical Modeling, at the University of Chile
 Centro de Investigación en Matemáticas, Guanajuato, Guanajuato in Mexico
 Courant Institute of Mathematical Sciences, at New York University
 Fields Institute, at the University of Toronto
 Institute for Advanced Study, in Princeton, New Jersey
 Institute for Mathematics and its Applications, at the University of Minnesota
 Institute for Pure and Applied Mathematics, at the University of California, Los Angeles
 Instituto Nacional de Matemática Pura e Aplicada, Rio de Janeiro, Brazil
 Mathematical Sciences Research Institute, at the University of California, Berkeley
 PPGMAp, at the Universidade Federal do Rio Grande do Sul in Brazil

Europe
 Brunel Institute of Computational Mathematics, in Uxbridge, UK
 Central Economic Mathematical Institute, at the Russian Academy of Sciences
 Centre de Recerca Matemàtica, at the Autonomous University of Barcelona
 Centrum Wiskunde & Informatica, at Science Park, Amsterdam
 CoMPLEX, at University College London
 Fachinformationszentrum Karlsruhe, Germany
 Hamilton Mathematics Institute, at Trinity College, Dublin, Ireland
 Hausdorff Center for Mathematics, Bonn, Germany
 Institut de Mathématiques de Toulouse, France
 Institute for Experimental Mathematics, at the University of Duisburg-Essen in Germany
 Institute of Mathematics (National Academy of Sciences of Belarus)
 Institute of Mathematics of the National Academy of Sciences of Ukraine
 Institute of Mathematics and its Applications, a UK society
 The Institute of Mathematics and Computer Science, University of Latvia
 Institute of Mathematics and Informatics (Bulgarian Academy of Sciences)
 Institute of Mathematics of National Academy of Sciences of Armenia
 Institute of Mathematics of the Romanian Academy at Bucharest
 Institute of Mathematics, Physics, and Mechanics in Slovenia
 Institut des Hautes Études Scientifiques, near Paris, France
 Institut Henri Poincaré, Paris, France
 International Centre for Mathematical Sciences, at Edinburgh
 Isaac Newton Institute, at the University of Cambridge
 János Bolyai Mathematical Institute, at the University of Szeged in Hungary
 Keldysh Institute of Applied Mathematics, at the Russian Academy of Sciences
 The Mathematical Institute, University of Oxford
 Max Planck Institute for Mathematics, Bonn, Germany
 Max Planck Institute for Mathematics in the Sciences at Leipzig
 Mittag-Leffler Institute, Stockholm. Sweden
 Moscow State Institute of Electronics and Mathematics
 Oberwolfach Research Institute for Mathematics, Oberwolfach, Germany
 Steklov Institute of Mathematics, Moscow, Russia
 University of Copenhagen Institute for Mathematical Sciences

Asia
 Chennai Mathematical Institute, India
 CR Rao Advanced Institute of Mathematics, Statistics and Computer Science, at the University of Hyderabad in India
 Einstein Institute of Mathematics, Jerusalem
 Harish-Chandra Research Institute, Allahabad, India
 Indian Statistical Institute, Kolkata in India
 Institute for Studies in Theoretical Physics and Mathematics, Tehran, Iran
 Institute of Applied Physics and Computational Mathematics, Beijing
 Institute of Mathematical Sciences, Chennai, India
 Institute of Mathematics and Applications, Bhubaneswar, India
 National Institute for Mathematical Sciences, Korea
 Korea Institute for Advanced Study, Korea
 Research Institute for Mathematical Sciences, at Kyoto University, Japan
 TIFR Centre for Applicable Mathematics, India

Australia
 Australian Mathematical Sciences Institute at the University of Melbourne

Africa
 African Institute for Mathematical Sciences, Muizenberg, South Africa

Statistical mathematics
 Institute of Mathematical Statistics, United States
 Institute of Statistical Mathematics, Japan

See also
 
 Institute of Mathematics and Applications (disambiguation)

Schools of mathematics
Mathematical institutes